ETW may refer to:
 East to West, an American Contemporary Christian music duo active 1993–1997
 Eastern Trombone Workshop, one of the largest annual events for trombone in the world, held at Brucker Hall in Fort Myer, Virginia
 Empire: Total War, a strategy game by Creative Assembly
 End Time Warriors, an American Christian rap group active 1989–1997
 E.T.W. (album), a 1989 album by End Time Warriors
 The European Transonic Wind Tunnel, a high-Reynolds-number transonic wind tunnel using nitrogen as test gas
 Event Tracing for Windows, a software analysis tool